Thomas Parker (1783–1860) was a judge, writer, and philanthropist from Maine, who is the namesake of Parker Hall at Bates College.

Parker was born in 1783 in Edgartown, Massachusetts but moved to Farmington, Maine as a child with his father, Elvation Parker, and eventually worked for a period as a stonemason. In 1807 he married Judith Thomas. Parker served as a County Commissioner for several years and in 1838 Governor Edward Kent appointed Parker to be a probate judge from Franklin County where he served until 1845.

Parker later carried on extensive business in the probate courts.  In 1846 Parker published a book on the History of Farmington Maine

In 1856 he donated $5,000 to Bates College then called the Maine State Seminary, and Parker Hall at Bates is named in his honor.

He died in 1860.

References

Maine state court judges
Bates College people
1783 births
1860 deaths
People from Edgartown, Massachusetts
People from Farmington, Maine
19th-century American judges